Corrado "Dino" Contin (7 January 1922 – 16 November 2001) was an Italian professional football player.

He played for 4 seasons (65 games, no goals) in the Serie A for A.S. Roma. He played for Deportivo Samarios in Colombia along with two other Italian footballers, Bruno Gerzelli and Alessandro Adam.

Contin was married to Aileen Courteen (1929–2013), who he met in Caracas, Venezuela. They resided there for more than 30 years and had one daughter. After retiring in 1990, Contin divided his time between Cervignano, Italy and Wickenburg, Arizona. He died in November 2001 at the age of 79.

References

External links
Profile at Enciclopediadelcalcio.it

1922 births
2001 deaths
A.S. Roma players
A.C. Cuneo 1905 players
Italian footballers
Serie A players
Unión Magdalena footballers
Association football defenders